The Thunderbox Heavyweight Tournament was a heavyweight boxing elimination tournament, held on 30 November 2002 by Cedric Kushner at the Trump Taj Mahal Casino Resort in Atlantic City, New Jersey.  There were several rap acts that performed at the event, including Xzibit, Eve, and Krumbsnatcha.

All bouts were for 3 rounds.

Results:

First Round:
Maurice Harris W Pts Gerald Nobles
Derrick Jefferson W RSF 2 Ray Austin
Israel Garcia W Pts Tim Witherspoon
Tony Thompson D Pts Jeremy Williams (Thompson won on punches landed)

Semi-final:
Maurice Harris W Pts Israel Garcia
Tony Thompson W Pts Derrick Jefferson

Final:
Maurice Harris W Pts Tony Thompson

Maurice Harris won $100,000 in prize money.

Boxing "Girls":
Cali O'Keefe

Key:
W - Won by
D - Drew on
Pts - points
RSF [number] - Referee stopped fight in the [number] round

See also
 Boxing
 Marquess of Queensberry rules

Boxing competitions in the United States
2002 in American sports
2002 in sports in New Jersey
Boxing in Atlantic City, New Jersey
2002 in boxing